Alessandro Di Gregorio, known professionally as Alex Di Gregorio (born June 20, 1962), is an Italian editorial cartoonist and author best known for his commentary on Italian national domestic and foreign policy from a progressive perspective.

Beginnings
Alex Di Gregorio was born in Parma but he grew up in Alessandria to a Roman Catholic family. He started drawing at a precocious age. His first works are classmate portraits when he was six.

Career
After graduating in 1981, Di Gregorio made his artistic debut as cartoonist in local newspapers in Alessandria. He moved to Milan in 1994 to become cartoonist for Mediolanum and Standa, making storyboards for Economic TV shows, and cartoonist in Retequattro's TV show "Quadrante economico", created by Carlo Maria Lomartire. In 1998 he became cartoonist in the Italian TV Telemontecarlo, then La7 television show Crono-tempo di motori. Since 1997, he is cartoonist at christian-democratic newspaper "La Discussione". His cartoons appear in Italian newspaper titles like "L'Indipendente", "Liberal", "Con", "L'Ago & il Filo", "Il Secolo d'Italia". From 2008, is cartoonist and communications, graphic and project manager of intellectual and author Magdi Cristiano Allam. Currently, Alex is cartoonist at "The Defender", the Robert F. Kennedy jr's Children's Health Defense Magazine;  "Coldiretti", the largest Italian Farmers Union; "Univerde"; "Anbi". He always insisted on total editorial independence. As a lifetime Christian Democrat, he focussed most of his attacks on the Conservative figures.

On April 18, 2005, a series of Alex Di Gregorio's cartoons published on Italian Christian Democrats website criticized Italian Premier Silvio Berlusconi, mainly for the perilous course of his Administration. He usually satirized and criticized politicians and administrators and took the issues of the day: economic problems; abortion; the influence of fundamentalist Islamic groups and their impact on public policy.

Personal life
While he criticized the Soviet Union and other communist aggressions, he also believed in policy dialogue between USA and USSR. He has a great interest in American political history, and human and civil rights and is a Robert F. Kennedy Center for Justice and Human Rights member, subscribed to the John F. Kennedy Presidential Library and Museum, member of the Edward M. Kennedy Institute and Robert F. Kennedy jr's Children's Health Defense. He has published a cartoon about Robert Kennedy, RFK, the Dream Carries On (Washington DC, 2003) and "Pierre Salinger, le Superman de la Communication" edit by Pierre and Poppy Salinger Foundation (Avignon, France, 2007).

He is a staunch supporter of animal rights and owns a dog called Teddy and two cats called Rory and Tigre.

Honors
On October 19, 2014, Alex Di Gregorio won a "Balena Bianca" Award for editorial cartoon.

References

External links 

 

1962 births
Living people
Italian editorial cartoonists
Italian cartoonists